Kırmızı Minare Mosque (Red Minaret Mosque) is a mosque in the Hasköy neighborhood of Beyoğlu, Istanbul, Turkey. It was probably built in 1591 by Kiremitçi Ahmet Agha and so is also known as the Kiremitçi Ahmet Agha Mosque. It received the name "Red Minaret" because of its red brick minaret. The building was restored in 1889 and 1994.

References
 Beyoğlu Müftülüğü (Office of the Beyoğlu Mufti). Kiremitçi Ahmet Ağa Camii. URL: https://web.archive.org/web/20110905115831/http://www.beyoglumuftulugu.gov.tr/index.php?modul=cami&id=50 Retrieved 14 October 2009.

Ottoman mosques in Istanbul
Golden Horn
Religious buildings and structures completed in 1591
16th-century mosques